Terpene synthases include:

 β-farnesene synthase
 (3R,6E)-nerolidol synthase
 (-)-α-pinene synthase
 (E)-β-ocimene synthase

These synthases' structures may include:
 Terpene synthase N terminal domain
 Terpene synthase C terminal domain

Biosynthesis